This is a list of all the songs by South Korean girl group GFriend. The group has released 93 songs in total since debut in 2015 until November 2020 with 4 studio albums, 1 compilation album, one reissue and 10 extended plays.

A

B

C

D

E

F

G

H

I

K

L

M

N

O

P

R

S

T

U

V

W

Y

Other songs

References 

GFriend